Charlottetown Airport  is located adjacent to Charlottetown, Labrador, Newfoundland and Labrador, Canada.

As of March 2017, Charlottetown is not listed as a scheduled destination in the Air Labrador flight schedule.

References

Certified airports in Newfoundland and Labrador